Daniel Doré (born April 9, 1970) is a Canadian former professional ice hockey right winger. He was drafted in the first round, fifth overall, by the Quebec Nordiques in the 1988 NHL Entry Draft. He played just 17 games in the National Hockey League (NHL), all with the Nordiques: 16 in the 1989–90 season and one more the next season.

After his professional career, Doré played three seasons in the Roller Hockey International (RHI) before retiring in 1996. From there, he served as a scout for the Boston Bruins for 11 years until he was fired in June 2007.

Doré is currently an Amateur Scout for the New York Rangers.

Career statistics

References

External links

1970 births
Boston Bruins scouts
Canadian ice hockey right wingers
Chatham Wheels players
Chicoutimi Saguenéens (QMJHL) players
Drummondville Voltigeurs players
Empire State Cobras players
Greensboro Monarchs players
Halifax Citadels players
Hershey Bears players
Ice hockey people from Quebec
Living people
Montreal Roadrunners players
National Hockey League first-round draft picks
New York Rangers scouts
People from Laurentides
Quebec Nordiques draft picks
Quebec Nordiques players